The Stolen Children, or Stolen Generations, were children of Australian aboriginal descent removed from their families by the state during the 20th century.

Stolen Children may also refer to:

 The Stolen Children, 1992 film
 Stolen Children (miniseries)
 Children taken from mothers in Francoist Spain and given to supporters of the regime

See also
 Lost Children (disambiguation)
 Stolen Babies